The Oradea Power Station is a large thermal power plant located in Oradea, having 5 generation groups, 4 of 50 MW each and one of 5 MW resulting a total electricity generation capacity of 205 MW.

See also

 List of power stations in Romania

References

External links
Description 

Coal-fired power stations in Romania